Heyang County is a county in Shaanxi Province, China, bordering Shanxi Province to the east across the Yellow River. It is under the administration of the prefecture-level city of Weinan.

History
Heyang County dates to at least the early Han, when Liu Bang's elder brother Liu Xi was demoted to being its marquess after fleeing a Xiongnu attack on Dai BC.

Legacy
A species of stone loach, Triplophysa heyangensis, is named after Heyang County where it was first discovered.

Administrative divisions
As 2016, this county is divided to 12 towns.
Towns

Climate

References

County-level divisions of Shaanxi
Weinan